The sicklefin chimaera (Neoharriotta pinnata) is a species of fish in the family Rhinochimaeridae found near Angola, the Republic of the Congo, the Democratic Republic of the Congo, Gabon, Ghana, Guinea, Liberia, Mauritania, Namibia, Senegal, Sierra Leone, and Western Sahara. It is also reported from Gulf of Mannar, India. Its natural habitat is open seas.

References

Neoharriotta
Taxonomy articles created by Polbot
Fish described in 1931